Casalduni is a comune (municipality) in the Province of Benevento in the Italian region Campania, located about 60 km northeast of Naples and about 15 km northwest of Benevento, on the slopes of Monte Cicco on the right of the Tammaro river.

History

Casalduni is mostly remembered as the location, along with Pontelandolfo, of a massacre of largely civilian population by the Piedmontese occupation troops in 1861.

References

Cities and towns in Campania